Trevor "Blake" Wesley (born July 10, 1959) is a Canadian former professional ice hockey defenceman who played parts of seven seasons in the National Hockey League (NHL) for the Philadelphia Flyers, Hartford Whalers, Quebec Nordiques and Toronto Maple Leafs.

Career
Wesley was born in Red Deer, Alberta. His younger brother Glen also played in the NHL. Wesley's nephew, Josh Wesley, was drafted by the Carolina Hurricanes in the 2014 NHL Entry Draft.

Career statistics

Regular season and playoffs

Awards
 WHL Second All-Star Team – 1979

References

External links
 

1959 births
Living people
Canadian ice hockey defencemen
Fredericton Express players
Hartford Whalers players
Ice hockey people from Alberta
Maine Mariners players
Newmarket Saints players
Philadelphia Flyers draft picks
Philadelphia Flyers players
Portland Rage players
Portland Winterhawks players
Quebec Nordiques players
Red Deer Rustlers players
Sportspeople from Red Deer, Alberta
St. Catharines Saints players
Toronto Maple Leafs players